J.R. O'Dwyer Company is an online and print news and information publisher covering the public relations and marketing communications fields in New York City, established in 1968.

O'Dwyer's magazine

O'Dwyer's is a monthly magazine that covers marketing communications, new media, public relations and related fields.  It is edited by Jon Gingerich. Jack O'Dwyer is the Editor in Chief. It was previously titled O'Dwyer's PR Report.

Public relations rankings
The O'Dwyer company publishes rankings of the PR companies in the United States through annual directories.

According to Jack O'Dwyer, there are 12 categories of rankings.  In order to be ranked, PR firms must provide financial documents, such as the top page of their latest income tax return and their W-3 form showing payroll.

Other publications

Periodicals
 O'Dwyer's PR services report. Monthly,  and 
 O'Dwyer's Washington, D.C. public relations directory. Annual, 1994 —
 O'Dwyer's PR buyer's guide

Books

Legal dispute
O'Dwyer shared partial transcripts of a presentation from PRSA's annual conference in 1993 to criticize the speaker's ethics for promoting the use of advertising spend to influence editorial at major newspapers. The speaker sued O'Dwyer for copyright infringement and the court ruled that O'Dwyer was protected under fair use. Copyright.gov reports "The court granted defendants’ motion to dismiss, finding that defendants’ publication of articles discussing plaintiff's public speech and defendants’ distribution of the transcripts constituted fair use. The court held that defendants’ purposes were to fairly and reasonably review, comment on, and criticize plaintiff's speech."

References

External links

Publishing companies of the United States
Publishing companies established in 1968
1968 establishments in New York (state)